Linck may refer to:

 Linck Group, an American investment group
 Linck Nunataks, in the Whitmore Mountains, Antarctica

People with the surname

 Johann Heinrich Linck, the elder (1674–1734), German pharmacist and naturalist
 Catharina Margaretha Linck (1694–1721), German transgender man
 Johann Heinrich Linck, the younger (1734–1807), German pharmacist and naturalist, son of the above
 Wenceslaus Linck (1736–post 1790), Bohemian missionary and explorer in Baja California
 Gottlob Linck (1858–1947), German mineralogist
 Ernst Linck (1874–1935), Swiss painter
 Schiøler Linck (1878-1952), Danish actor
 Kurt Linck (1889–?), German religious writer
 Louis Linck (1895–1962), French sculptor
 Roberto Linck Brazilian/American professional soccer player and owner of Linck Group